The gnome fruit-eating bat (Dermanura gnoma) is a bat species found in Bolivia, Brazil, Colombia, Ecuador, French Guiana, Guyana, Peru, Suriname and Venezuela. This species was originally determined to be different from the other known species of fruit bats, but later, in 1994 was mistakenly grouped under Artibeus cinereus as a synonym. However, this has since been corrected by more closely studying their physical differences and by biomolecular analysis.

References

External links

Dermanura
Bats of South America
Bats of Brazil
Mammals of Bolivia
Mammals of Colombia
Mammals of Ecuador
Mammals of French Guiana
Mammals of Guyana
Mammals of Peru
Mammals of Suriname
Mammals of Venezuela
Fauna of the Amazon
Mammals described in 1987